This is a list of amphibian species and subspecies found in North Carolina, based mainly on checklists from the North Carolina Museum of Natural Sciences. Common and scientific names are according to the Society for the Study of Amphibians and Reptiles publications.

Salamanders
Order: Caudata
Family: Sirenidae
Eastern lesser siren Siren intermedia intermedia
Greater siren Siren lacertina
Family: Cryptobranchidae
Eastern hellbender Cryptobranchus alleganiensis alleganiensis
Family: Proteidae
Neuse River waterdog Necturus lewisi
Common mudpuppy Necturus maculosus maculosus
Dwarf waterdog Necturus punctatus
Family: Amphiumidae
Two-toed amphiuma Amphiuma means
Family: Ambystomatidae
Mabee's salamander Ambystoma mabeei
Spotted salamander Ambystoma maculatum
Marbled salamander Ambystoma opacum
Mole salamander Ambystoma talpoideum
Eastern tiger salamander Ambystoma tigrinum
Family: Salamandridae
Red-spotted newt Notophthalmus viridescens viridescens
Broken-striped newt Notophthalmus viridescens dorsalis
Family: Plethodontidae
Green salamander Aneides aeneus
Seepage salamander Desmognathus aeneus
Holbrook's southern dusky salamander Desmognathus auriculatus
Carolina mountain dusky salamander Desmognathus carolinensis
Spotted dusky salamander Desmognathus conanti
Dwarf black-bellied salamander Desmognathus folkertsi
Northern dusky salamander Desmognathus fuscus
Imitator salamander Desmognathus imitator
Shovel-nosed salamander Desmognathus marmoratus
Seal salamander Desmognathus monticola
Ocoee salamander Desmognathus ocoee
Blue Ridge dusky salamander Desmognathus orestes
Northern pygmy salamander Desmognathus organi
Black-bellied salamander Desmognathus quadramaculatus
Santeetlah dusky salamander Desmognathus santeetlah
Pygmy salamander Desmognathus wrighti
Chamberlain's dwarf salamander Eurycea chamberlaini
Southern two-lined salamander Eurycea cirrigera
Three-lined salamander Eurycea guttolineata
Junaluska salamander Eurycea junaluska
Long-tailed salamander Eurycea longicauda
Southeastern dwarf salamander Eurycea quadridigitata
Blue Ridge two-lined salamander Eurycea wilderae
Blue Ridge spring salamander Gyrinophilus porphyriticus danielsi
Carolina spring salamander Gyrinophilus porphyriticus dunni
Northern spring salamander Gyrinophilus porphyriticus porphyriticus
Four-toed salamander Hemidactylium scutatum
Blue Ridge gray-cheeked salamander Plethodon amplus
Tellico salamander Plethodon aureolus
Chattahoochee slimy salamander Plethodon chattahoochee
Cheoah Bald salamander Plethodon cheoah
Atlantic Coast slimy salamander Plethodon chlorobryonis
Eastern red-backed salamander Plethodon cinereus
White-spotted slimy salamander Plethodon cylindraceus
Northern slimy salamander Plethodon glutinosus
Red-cheeked salamander Plethodon jordani
South Mountain gray-cheeked salamander Plethodon meridianus
Southern gray-cheeked salamander Plethodon metcalfi
Northern gray-cheeked salamander Plethodon montanus
Southern ravine salamander Plethodon richmondi
Southern red-backed salamander Plethodon serratus
Red-legged salamander Plethodon shermani
Southern Appalachian salamander Plethodon teyahalee
Southern zigzag salamander Plethodon ventralis
Wehrle's salamander Plethodon wehrlei
Weller's salamander Plethodon welleri
Yonahlossee salamander Plethodon yonahlossee
Mud salamander Pseudotriton montanus
Blue Ridge red salamander Pseudotriton ruber nitidus
Northern red salamander Pseudotriton ruber ruber
Black-chinned red salamander Pseudotriton ruber schencki
Many-lined salamander Stereochilus marginatus

Frogs
Order: Anura
Family: Scaphiopodidae
Eastern spadefoot Scaphiopus holbrookii
Family: Bufonidae
Eastern American toad Anaxyrus americanus americanus
Fowler's toad Anaxyrus fowleri
Oak toad Anaxyrus quercicus
Southern toad Anaxyrus terrestris
Family: Hylidae
Eastern cricket frog Acris crepitans
Southern cricket frog Acris gryllus
Pine Barrens treefrog Hyla andersonii
Cope's gray treefrog Hyla chrysoscelis
Green treefrog Hyla cinerea
Pine woods treefrog Hyla femoralis
Barking treefrog Hyla gratiosa
Squirrel treefrog Hyla squirella
Gray treefrog Hyla versicolor
Mountain chorus frog Pseudacris brachyphona
Brimley's chorus frog Pseudacris brimleyi
Spring peeper Pseudacris crucifer
Upland chorus frog Pseudacris feriarum
Southern chorus frog Pseudacris nigrita
Little grass frog Pseudacris ocularis
Ornate chorus frog Pseudacris ornata
Family: Microhylidae
Eastern narrow-mouthed toad Gastrophryne carolinensis
Family: Ranidae
Gopher frog Lithobates capito
American bullfrog Lithobates catesbeianus
Green frog Lithobates clamitans
River frog Lithobates heckscheri
Pickerel frog Lithobates palustris
Southern leopard frog Lithobates sphenocephalus
Wood frog Lithobates sylvaticus
Carpenter frog Lithobates virgatipes

References

Further reading

External links

SSAR North American Species Names Database
Integrated Taxonomic Information System

North Carolina
Amphibians